Red Castle or Redcastle may refer to:

 Red Castle of Tripoli, Libya
 Red Castle Museum
 Red Castle, Angus, Scotland at Lunan Bay
 Redcastle, Highland, Scotland on the Black Isle in what was Easter Ross
 Redcastle, County Donegal, a small village in County Donegal, Ireland
 , Russia
 Red Castle, Shropshire, a ruin at Hawkstone Park, near Weston-under-Redcastle, Shropshire, England

See also
 Red Fort, Delhi
 Agra Fort, also known as the Red Fort
 Château Rouge in Belgium
 Château-Rouge in Moselle, France
 Château Rouge (Paris Métro)
 Rotenburg (disambiguation), meaning Red Castle in German
 Akagi (disambiguation), meaning Red Castle in Japanese
 Kastellorizo, whose name may come from the Italian 
 La Muralla Roja, a housing complex in Spain
 Castell Coch, a 19th-century Gothic Revival castle built above an older castle at Tongwynlais in South Wales
 St Kevin's College, Oamaru, also called Redcastle
 Kellereischloss, Bavaria, Germany, also known as Red Castle
 Waldsteinburg, Bavaria, Germany, also known as Red Castle